Simona Castro (born January 11, 1989 in Santiago, Chile) is a Chilean gymnast who competed at the 2012, 2016, and 2020 Olympic Games. She has a sister who is an artistic gymnast, Martina Castro.

She has been a part of the Chile National Gymnastics team since 2001. At the 2005 World Championships in Melbourne, she debuted at the senior international level, achieving 53rd place in the all-around. At the 2007 South American Championships in Colombia, she won the gold medal in the floor exercise. In 2009, she left Santiago to begin her college career at the University of Denver, majoring in business administration. At the 2011 South American Championships in Santiago, she won the silver medal on the balance beam. That same year at World Championships in Tokyo, Japan  she achieved 76th place, creating the spot for Chile at the Test Event in January 2012. She achieved the best result ever for a Chilean female gymnast at the world level. At the 2012 Pan-American Championships in Medellín, Colombia, she won the bronze on the balance beam. In March 2014, she won gold on the balance beam and silver in the All Around at South American Games, hosted in Santiago, Chile.

London 2012
On January 11, 2012, she achieved 24th place at the Test Event in London to give her a spot at the 2012 Summer Olympics. At the games, she finished in 43rd place in the all-around.

Rio 2016 
She also competed at the 2016 Olympics, finishing 52nd in the individual all-around.

References

1989 births
Living people
Chilean female artistic gymnasts
Olympic gymnasts of Chile
Gymnasts at the 2019 Pan American Games
Gymnasts at the 2012 Summer Olympics
Gymnasts at the 2016 Summer Olympics
South American Games gold medalists for Chile
South American Games silver medalists for Chile
South American Games medalists in gymnastics
Competitors at the 2014 South American Games
Pan American Games competitors for Chile
Gymnasts at the 2020 Summer Olympics
20th-century Chilean women
21st-century Chilean women